Mike Sekabembe (born 1 January 1980) is a Ugandan boxer. He competed in the super heavyweight category at the 2014 Commonwealth Games where he won a bronze medal.

References

External links

1980 births
Living people
Commonwealth Games bronze medallists for Uganda
Boxers at the 2014 Commonwealth Games
Ugandan male boxers
Commonwealth Games medallists in boxing
Super-heavyweight boxers
Medallists at the 2014 Commonwealth Games